Robert F. Hill (April 14, 1886 – March 18, 1966) was a Canadian film director, screenwriter, and actor.

Career

Bob Hill began his screen career in 1915 at Universal Pictures. In those early days, members of film crews were sometimes called upon to do double duty, and young actor Hill also showed a talent for writing and directing. Universal had several popular series of short subjects, and Hill contributed to several. He became an action specialist, working in westerns, outdoor adventures, and serials.

Like other established silent-film directors Christy Cabanne, William Beaudine, Elmer Clifton, Lambert Hillyer, and Harry Fraser, Hill was given fewer major assignments in talking pictures. Although Hill began the sound era with Universal, he soon was forced to freelance for independent producers like Sol Lesser, Max and Arthur Alexander, and Sam Katzman. Sometimes the producers' budgets were so very low that Hill was challenged to make his films look presentable. His 1935 serial Queen of the Jungle was largely composed of silent footage filmed in 1922 for The Jungle Goddess; Hill shot new "jungle" scenes on an indoor soundstage to tie the silent material together. Likewise, Hill's 1937 serial Shadow of Chinatown, starring Bela Lugosi, suffered from Sam Katzman's typically cheap production mountings, but Hill (under the pseudonym Rock Hawkey) fashioned a serviceable screenplay that kept the various perils within the budget.

Hill became one of Katzman's standbys, sometimes directing Olympic athlete and action star Herman Brix. Hill's last film for Katzman was East Side Kids (1940), launching a popular knockoff of the Dead End Kids. Hill returned to direct major-studio work only once; he co-directed Universal's 1938 serial Flash Gordon's Trip to Mars.

Hill often played cameo roles in films he directed -- not out of vanity, but because he was handy if an actor was suddenly needed. In the 1940s Hill gave up the feverish pace of low-budget filmmaking and returned to acting full-time. Now white-haired and bespectacled, he played doctors, ministers, judges, and professional men. 

He retired from the industry in 1950, and died in 1966 at the age of 79.

Selected filmography

External links

Canadian expatriate male actors in the United States
Film directors from Ontario
Canadian male film actors
Canadian male silent film actors
Film serial crew
People from Norfolk County, Ontario
1886 births
1966 deaths
Silent film directors
Silent film screenwriters
20th-century Canadian male actors
20th-century screenwriters